The IFAF Junior World Championship or IFAF Junior World Cup is a biennial competition for American football which ran from 2009 to 2020 and was the precursor of the quadrennial IFAF U20 World Cup with the first event scheduled for 2024 in Canada.

IFAF U19 World Cup 
 
The IFAF U19 World Cup is the precursor of the IFAF U20 World Cup. The U19 World Cup was the world championship of American football for players under the age of 19 organized by the International Federation of American Football. From 2012 through 2018, the age designation "U-19" was used in the tournament title. An age adjustment ratified by IFAF has repositioned the premiere junior competition as the U20 IFAF World Junior Championship in 2024 hosted in Edmonton, Alberta on a four-year cycle.

It was announced in June 2008 and the first competition started on Saturday, June 27, 2009, at Canton, Ohio. The tournament replaced the eleven-year running NFL Global Junior Championship and is held every two years.

IFAF U20 World Cup 
The first iteration of the competition was known as the IFAF Junior World Cup and served as the world championship of American football for players under the age of 19 organized by the International Federation of American Football.

The 2020 championships scheduled for Canton, Ohio were cancelled on 3 March 2020 due to the Coronavirus pandemic. A 2021 event was scheduled for Vancouver, Canada to replace the 2020 event. This event was cancelled on 13 March 2021 due to the Coronavirus pandemic.

Results

References

IFAF competitions
IFAF Junior World Cup
Recurring sporting events established in 2009